Section B are a group of football supporters who follow Airdrieonians F.C., and before the current club's formation in 2002, followed the original Airdrieonians. The group, formed in 1977, have been well known throughout Scottish football for their boisterous, vociferous and often violent behaviour for over 40 years. 

Section B have featured in several publications over the years, including The Idler Book of Crap Towns II (2004), Hooligans (September 2005 and updated September 2007), Front Magazine (February 2006), Lifted Over The Turnstiles (DC Thomson, 2018) and The Scottish Sun (March 2022). In March 2020, Section B were discussed on BBC Radio Scotland's Off The Ball programme.

Formation
During the late 1960s and early to mid-1970s the town of Airdrie often witnessed hooliganism and misbehaviour in and around the old Broomfield Park where Airdrieonians played. The larger clubs — namely Celtic, Rangers, Hearts and Hibs, would typically have an element of their support that would often cause bother with the local fans. Section B were formed as a direct response to this threat, and were originally made up of an amalgamation of smaller groups of gangs from around the town. This diverse mixture combined punks, mods and others.

Contrary to popular belief, Section B were not named after the area of terracing where they mainly stood, but in tribute to a local punk band by the same name who were active at the time. In the last few years Section B have attended the more important and significant games (and clashes with rivals where the football clubs are not meeting) where numbers can still attain 50-80 plus, and on occasion as high as 100 or more.

Activity
Along with clashes with Celtic Soccer Crew, Aberdeen Soccer Casuals and several other hooligan groups, Section B have been involved in many incidents throughout the years:
February 2023; Airdrieonians FC issue a photograph and statement online asking for help following a number of "incidents" around the stadium at a League One game against Dunfermline Athletic.  
March 2022; The Daily Record, The Scottish Sun and The Press and Journal newspapers, along with a statement from the club itself, reported on several Cove Rangers fans being assaulted outside Excelsior Stadium immediately after a League One fixture. 
January 2022; The Daily Record and Scottish Football Away Days Facebook page reported and featured details on fighting near Firhill Stadium with the North Glasgow Express (NGE) before and after a Scottish Cup 4th round game against Partick Thistle. 
July 2021; Three arrests were made following fights with Motherwell's Saturday Service (SS) before and after a Premier Sports Cup game at Airdrie. The incident was reported in the Scottish press. 
January 2020; Prior to a Scottish Cup game, around 80 clashed with Hearts near Tynecastle stadium, with two men arrested. The incident was reported in the Scottish press.
January 2019; Before a Scottish Cup game against Celtic trouble flared as Section B joined up with Wigan Athletic's 'Goon Squad', the 140-strong group making their way from Glasgow City Centre via Gallowgate and the Barras, with police intervening following skirmishes in the area. Mounted police escorted the group along London Road. During the game, three red and white flares were let off in the away end, and afterwards (following a 20-minute lock in) the group were escorted back along London Road, a brief exchange with Celtic taking place in the Barras area again. Three Celtic fans and one from Wigan were arrested.
July 2018; A group of Section B joined up with some Wigan Athletic 'Goon Squad' (after their club's friendly at Ibrox) in Glasgow city centre and fought with Rangers Inter City Firm (ICF). The scenes can be found on YouTube. 
April 2016; Prior to a fixture at Ayr Utd's Somerset Park, a number were involved in a disturbance with police in Ayr town centre, resulting in the arrest of an individual who was later charged for being in possession of a knife. A year later, Airdrie fan Stephen McInnes had been charged and fined £4000 and banned from attending football grounds for three years.
November 2015; Police intervened after scuffles broke out between security/stewards and 10-15 at Ayr Utd's Somerset Park during a league game.
April 2015; Some Airdrie fans invaded Forfar Athletic's pitch, Station Park, at the end of a league game to confront goalkeeper, Rab Douglas. As a result of this, Ian Bear (who had received a previous banning order) and Ryan Lawrence (son of former Airdrie player Alan Lawrence) both received a 3-month jail sentence and a 5-year banning order in August 2016.
January 2014; About 20-25 were prevented by police from leaving the outside of New Broomfield and escorted to Airdrie town centre after a league match with Rangers.
August 2013; Police held back and escorted a number following a match with Rangers in Airdrie.  
April 2013; A policeman was seriously assaulted and nine fans were arrested as a total of 60 Section B and Ayr Utd's Ayr Service Crew (ASC) battled near Coatbridge town centre. Following this incident, police made 20 further arrests in Ayrshire in June 2013. This resulted in an Airdrie fan being jailed for 3 years.
May 2012; Some Section B came on to the field and challenged the celebrating Dumbarton fans at the end of the play-off final in Airdrie. They were escorted off the park by stewards.
March 2012; Wall and pitch graffiti appeared at Albion Rovers Cliftonhill stadium prior to a match.
March 2011; Fighting occurred in Airdrie town centre with Ayr Utd's ASC.
July 2010; Fighting broke out in Albion Rovers Cliftonhill ground at half time.
May 2010; Prior to a home game versus Dunfermline Athletic fighting broke out in the stadium bar.
November 2009; Dunfermline Athletic's Carnegie Soccer Service (CSS) met Section B after the end of the game in Airdrie.
October 2009; There was a confrontation with Ayr Utd's ASC in Airdrie with one Airdrie fan arrested.
May 2009; A pitched battle and mass brawl with Partick Thistle's North Glasgow Express (NGE) near Charing Cross in Glasgow.
November 2008; Two Airdrie fans were charged with vandalising McDiarmid Park stadium in Perth at the Challenge Cup Final game against Ross County.
May 2008; At the end of a home league game with Morton there was a fight on the pitch with the Morton Soccer Crew (MSC).
March 2008; Running battles with Hamilton's Accies Casual Force (ACF) near New Douglas Park.
2007; A number travelled to Glasgow when the Airdrie game was postponed due to snow, and engaged in a pre-arranged fight with Rangers ICF in the Gorbals.
September 2007; A racial incident at Gretna.
May 2007; Police tried (and failed) to keep around 50-plus in Excelsior Stadium (New Broomfield) at the end of a home game versus Dundee — the police were rushed and the scene was captured on camera.
January 2007; A major clash with Motherwell's Saturday Service (SS) in Airdrie town centre.
March 2006; Whilst trying to engage with St Johnstone's Fair City Firm (FCF), two Airdrie fans were arrested outside McDiarmid Park.
March 2006; Fighting in Paisley town centre with St. Mirren's Love Street Division (LSD). Following this, Airdrie fan Izak Cowie became the first person in Scotland banned from every football ground in the UK. Airdrie fan Ian Bear received a 5-year banning order after being charged with making Nazi salutes and challenging rival fans to fights.
February 2006; Between 60 and 70 Section B members caused disorder and tried to engage with the Dundee Utility Crew after the game against Dundee in Airdrie.
November 2005; St Mirren's LSD were in Airdrie for the 2005 Scottish Challenge Cup Final against Hamilton and fought with Section B.
May 2004; There was a confrontation with Motherwell's Saturday Service (SS) at the annual central Scotland Apprentice Boys of Derry parade which was being held in Airdrie that year.
September 2002; After a game at Kilmarnock the local 'Paninaro' were charged at outside Rugby Park, with two Airdrie fans arrested.
May 2002; At Somerset Park, home of Ayr United, the game was abandoned due to a pitch invasion and crossbar snapping.
March 2002; Airdrie's Section B and 'Falkirk Fear' clashed outside a Falkirk pub. A number on each side were arrested. The fight was captured on CCTV and can be found on YouTube.
February 2002; Around 60 clashed with a small number of Partick Thistle's NGE outside Firhill Stadium before the match. After the match, around 15-20 NGE attacked the Section B with weapons on Maryhill Road but had to run after being overwhelmed by Airdrie's larger numbers. 
September 2001; Around 50 clashed with the Motherwell SS outside Airdrie Sheriff Court. A number of lads on either side received injuries, with the fighting lasting a considerable length of time. 
May 1997; There was fighting with Hibernian's Capital City Service (CCS) around Easter Road after a play-off tie.
November 1994; Between 60 and 70 faced the Dundee Utility Crew outside McDiarmid Park in Perth after the 1994 Scottish Challenge Cup Final (B&Q Cup Final).
September 1992; 150 fans travelled to the Czech Republic and clashed with Sparta hooligans before and after the game.
March 1992; After a Scottish Cup game there was a  clash with Hibernian's Capital City Service (CCS). 
September 1991; After losing by penalty kicks to Dunfermline Athletic in the semi-final of the Scottish League Cup at Tynecastle Stadium, Edinburgh, between 40 and 50 vandalised cars and smashed windows of a pub.
1991; When the team was to play Clydebank, trouble was caused in The Atlantis pub on Kilbowie Road. This incident was reported in the Clydebank Post.
1983; At Cliftonhill, the home ground of Albion Rovers, the game was stopped twice with around 50-70 storming the home support. At the time the riot made the front page of The Glasgow Herald.
October 1980; Airdrieonians faced Bury away in the Anglo-Scottish Cup and Section B were charged at by mounted police in Lancashire.
1978; The Hibernian team bus was attacked in Airdrie.

References

External links
 https://gramho.com/explore-hashtag/airdriehooligans

Airdrieonians F.C.
British football hooligan firms
Airdrieonians F.C. (1878)
Gangs in Scotland
1977 establishments in Scotland
Association football supporters
1977 in British sport